is the fifth single by B'z, released on June 13, 1990. The song became the band's first single to reach #1, selling over 463,000 copies in Oricon chart and begins a streak of every released single hitting and/or debuting at the #1 spot that remains unbroken to the present day. The single was re-released in 2003, and re-entered at #10.

Usage in media
 Miki (Camelia Diamond) Commercial Song (#1)

Track listing
Komachi Angel
Good-bye Holy Days

Certifications

References

1990 singles
B'z songs
Oricon Weekly number-one singles
Songs written by Tak Matsumoto
Songs written by Koshi Inaba
1990 songs
BMG Japan singles